The 2nd Louisiana Field Battery was an artillery unit recruited from volunteers in Louisiana that fought in the Confederate States Army during the American Civil War. The battery organized on 1 March 1862 at Red River Landing, Louisiana as Company B, of Miles' Legion Artillery. However, the battery usually served independently from Miles' Legion. In 1863, the battery fought at Plains Store and Port Hudson and was captured when the latter place surrendered in July 1863. After a prisoner exchange, the battery reorganized in December 1863. The unit fought at Mansura in May 1864 using two large caliber Parrott rifles captured from Union vessels. In an action at Simmesport in June, one gun was captured and the other gun burst. The last soldiers in the battery received their paroles in early June 1865.

See also
List of Louisiana Confederate Civil War units
Louisiana in the Civil War

Notes

References
 
 

Units and formations of the Confederate States Army from Louisiana
1862 establishments in Louisiana
Military units and formations established in 1862
1865 disestablishments in Louisiana
Military units and formations disestablished in 1865